Spintex Road is a suburb of Accra, the capital of Ghana. The name originally denotes the road which is parallel to the Tema Motorway, has become generic and is used when describing the area along the route. Spintex Road is a vibrant travel destination in the colourful city of Accra, the capital of Ghana, winding down from the Tetteh Quarshie Interchange to the beach at Tema. In between, one will find market stalls overflowing with produce, smart city malls and a huge selection of restaurants to choose from.

References

Accra